Discovery and description of new Stylidium species has been occurring since the late 18th century, the first of which was discovered in Botany Bay in 1770 and described by Joseph Banks and Daniel Solander. In the early 19th century, the French botanist Charles François Antoine Morren described triggerplant anatomy, also providing illustrations with the descriptions.  As of 2002, only 221 Stylidium species were known. There are now over 300 species, many of which are awaiting formal description.

List of species 
 Stylidium accedens
 Stylidium aceratum
 Stylidium aciculare
 Stylidium acuminatum
 Syn.: S. spathulatum var. acuminatum
 Stylidium adenophorum
 Stylidium adnatum - beaked triggerplant
 S. adnatum var. abbreviatum
 Syn.: S. adnatum var. propinquum
 Syn.: S. fasciculatum : Pale beaked triggerplant
 Stylidium adpressum : Trigger-on-stilts
 Stylidium aeonioides
 Stylidium affine : Queen triggerplant
 Syn.: S. caricifolium var. affine
 Stylidium albolilacinum
 Stylidium albomontis
 Stylidium alsinoides
 Stylidium amabile
 Stylidium amoenum : lovely (or beautiful) triggerplant
 S.  amoenum var. caulescens
 Stylidium angustifolium
 Stylidium applanatum
 Stylidium aquaticum
 Stylidium arenicola
 Stylidium armeria
 Stylidium articulatum : stout triggerplant
 Stylidium assimile : bronze-leaved triggerplant
 Stylidium asymmetricum : asymmetric triggerplant
 Stylidium austrocapense
 Stylidium barleei : tooth-leaved triggerplant
 Stylidium bauthas
 Stylidium beaugleholei
 Stylidium begoniifolium
 Stylidium bellidifolium
 Stylidium bellum
 Stylidium bicolor
 Stylidium breviscapum : boomerang triggerplant
 Syn.: S. breviscapum var. erythrocalyx
 Stylidium brunonianum : pink fountain triggerplant
 Stylidium bulbiferum : circus triggerplant
 Syn.: S. recurvum
 Stylidium burbidgeanum
 Stylidium buxifolium
 Stylidium caespitosum : fly-away triggerplant
 Stylidium calcaratum : book triggerplant
 Stylidium candelabrum
 Stylidium capillare
 Stylidium caricifolium : Milkmaids
 Stylidium carlquistii
 Stylidium carnosum : fleshy-leaved triggerplant
 Stylidium caulescens
 Stylidium centrolepoides
 Stylidium ceratophorum
 Stylidium chiddarcoopingense
 Stylidium chinense
 Stylidium choreanthum : dancing triggerplant
 Stylidium cicatricosum
 Stylidium ciliatum : golden triggerplant
 Syn.: S. saxifragoides
 Stylidium cilium
 Syn.: S.  bulbiferum var. ciliatum
 Stylidium clarksonii
 Stylidium clavatum
 Syn.: S. luteum var. clavatum
 Stylidium claytonioides
 Stylidium coatesianum
 Stylidium compressum
 Stylidium confertum
 Stylidium confluens
 Stylidium cordifolium
 Stylidium coroniforme : Wongan Hills triggerplant
 Stylidium corymbosum : whitecaps
 Stylidium costulatum
 Stylidium crassifolium : Thick-leaved triggerplant
 Stylidium crossocephalum : posy triggerplant
 Stylidium cuneiformis
 Stylidium cygnorum
 Syn.: S. adpressum var. patens
 Stylidium cymiferum
 Stylidium daphne
 Stylidium darwinii
 Stylidium debile
 Stylidium delicatum
 Stylidium desertorum
 Stylidium despectum : dwarf triggerplant
 Stylidium diademum
 Stylidium diceratum
 Stylidium dichotomum : pins-and-needles
 Syn.: S. hookeri
 Syn.: S. mucronifolium
 Stylidium dicksonii
 Stylidium dielsianum : tangle triggerplant
 Stylidium diffusum
 Stylidium dilatatum
 Stylidium diplectroglossum
 Syn.: S. repens var. diplectroglossum
 Stylidium dispermum
 Stylidium diuroides : donkey triggerplant
 Stylidium divaricatum : daddy-long-legs
 Syn.: S. streptocarpum
 Stylidium divergens
 Stylidium diversifolium : touch-me-not
 Stylidium drummondianum
 Stylidium dunlopianum
 Stylidium ecorne : foot triggerplant
 Stylidium edentatum
 Stylidium eglandulosum : woolly-stemmed triggerplant
 Stylidium elongatum : tall triggerplant
 Syn.: S. crassifolium var. elongatum
 Stylidium emarginatum
 Stylidium ensatum
 Stylidium ericksoniae
 Stylidium eriopodum
 Stylidium eriorhizum
 Stylidium evolutum
 Stylidium exappendiculatum
 Stylidium exiguum
 Stylidium expeditionis : Tutanning triggerplant
 Stylidium falcatum : slender beaked triggerplant
 Stylidium ferricola
 Stylidium fimbriatum
 Stylidium fissilobum
 Stylidium flagellum
 Stylidium floodii
 Stylidium floribundum
 Stylidium flumense
 Stylidium fluminense
 Stylidium foveolatum
 Stylidium fruticosum
 Stylidium galioides : yellow mountain triggerplant
 Stylidium glabrifolium
 Stylidium glandulosum : bushy triggerplant
 Stylidium glandulosissimum
 Syn.: S. luteum var. glandulosum
 Syn.: S. spathulatum var. glandulosum
 Stylidium glaucum : grey triggerplant
 Stylidium graminifolium : grass triggerplant
 Syn.: S. armeria
 Stylidium guttatum : dotted triggerplant
 Stylidium gypsophiloides
 Stylidium hebegynum
 Stylidium hirsutum : hairy triggerplant
 Stylidium hispidum : white butterfly triggerplant
 Stylidium hortiorum
 Stylidium hugelii
 Stylidium humphreysii
 Stylidium imbricatum : tile-leaved triggerplant
 Stylidium inaequipetalum
 Stylidium inconspicuum
 Stylidium induratum : desert triggerplant
 Stylidium insensitivum : insensitive triggerplant
 Stylidium inundatum : hundreds and thousands
 Syn.: S. brachyphyllum
 Stylidium inversiflorum
 Stylidium involucratum
 Syn.: * S. stowardii
 Stylidium ireneae
 Stylidium javanicum
 Stylidium junceum : reed triggerplant
 Syn.: S. junceum var. brevius
 Stylidium kalbarriense
 Stylidium keigheryi
 Stylidium korijekup
 Stylidium kunthii
 Syn.: S. brunonis
 Stylidium lachnopodum
 Stylidium laciniatum : tattered triggerplant
 Stylidium laricifolium : tree (or larch-leaf) triggerplant
 Syn.: S. ternifolium
 Stylidium lateriticola
 Stylidium lehmannianum
 Stylidium leiophyllum
 Stylidium lepidum : redcaps
 Stylidium leptobotrydium
 Stylidium leptobotrys
 Stylidium leptocalyx : slender-calyxed triggerplant
 Stylidium leptophyllum : needle-leaved triggerplant
 Stylidium leptorrhizum
 Syn.: S. barrettiorum
 Stylidium leptostachyum
 Stylidium lessonii
 Stylidium leeuwinense
 Stylidium limbatum : fringed-leaved triggerplant
 Stylidium lindleyanum
 Stylidium lineare : narrow-leaved triggerplant
 Stylidium lineatum : sunny triggerplant
 Stylidium lobuliflorum
 Stylidium longibracteatum : long-bracted triggerplant
 Stylidium longicornu
 Stylidium longifolium
 Stylidium longissimum
 Stylidium longitubum : jumping jacks
 Stylidium lowrieanum
 Stylidium luteum : yellow triggerplant
 Stylidium macranthum : crab claws
 Stylidium maitlandianum : fountain triggerplant
 Stylidium majus
 Stylidium marginatum
 Stylidium maritimum
 Stylidium marradongense
 Stylidium megacarpum
 Syn.: S. bulbiferum var. macrocarpum
 Stylidium melastachys
 Stylidium merrallii : Merralls triggerplant
 Stylidium mimeticum
 Stylidium miniatum : pink butterfly triggerplant
 Stylidium minus
 Stylidium mitchellii
 Stylidium mitrasacmoides
 Stylidium montanum
 Stylidium mucronatum
 Stylidium multiscapum
 Stylidium muscicola
 Stylidium neglectum : neglected triggerplant
 Stylidium nominatum
 Stylidium nonscandens
 Stylidium notabile
 Stylidium nudum
 Stylidium nunagarensis : Nungarin triggerplant
 Syn.: S. caricifolium var. nungarinense
 Stylidium nymphaeum
 Stylidium obtusatum : pinafore triggerplant
 S. obtusatum var. rubricalyx
 Syn.: S. rubricalyx : apron triggerplant
 S. obtusatum var. obtusatum
 Syn.: S. asteroideum : star triggerplant
 Syn.: S. bolgartense
 Stylidium ornatum
 Stylidium osculum
 Stylidium oviflorum
 Stylidium pachyrrhizum
 Stylidium paniculatum
 Stylidium paulineae
 Stylidium pedunculatum
 Syn.: S. bryoides
 Syn.: S. curtum
 Stylidium pendulum
 Stylidium periscelianthum : pantaloon triggerplant
 Stylidium perizostera
 Stylidium perminutum
 Stylidium perplexum 
 Stylidium perpusillum : tiny triggerplant
 Stylidium petiolare : horned triggerplant
 Stylidium piliferum : common butterfly triggerplant
 Stylidium pingrupense
 Stylidium planifolium
 Stylidium plantagineum : plantagenet triggerplant
 Syn.: S. elegans
 Stylidium polystachium
 Stylidium preissii : lizard triggerplant
 Stylidium pritzelianum : royal triggerplant
 Stylidium productum
 Stylidium proliferum
 Stylidium prophyllum
 Stylidium propinquum
 Stylidium pruinosum
 Stylidium pseudocaespitosum
 Stylidium pseudohirsutum
 Stylidium pseudosacculatum
 Stylidium pseudotenellum
 Stylidium pubigerum : yellow butterfly triggerplant
 Stylidium pulchellum : Thumbelina triggerplant
 Stylidium pulviniforme
 Stylidium pycnostachyum : downy triggerplant
 Stylidium pygmaeum : pygmy triggerplant
 Syn.: S. exoglossum : tongue triggerplant
 Stylidium quadrifurcatum : four-pronged triggerplant
 Stylidium ramosissimum
 Stylidium ramosum
 Stylidium reductum
 Stylidium reduplicatum
 Syn.: S. drummondii
 Syn.: S. pilosum : silky triggerplant
 Stylidium repens : matted triggerplant
 Syn.: S. radicans
 Stylidium rhipidium : fan triggerplant
 Stylidium rhynchocarpum : black-beaked triggerplant
 Stylidium ricae
 Stylidium rigidulum
 Syn.: S. leptophyllum var. glabrescens
 Syn.: S. macrocarpum : flagon triggerplant
 Stylidium rivulosum
 Stylidium robustum
 Stylidium roseo-alatum : pink-wing triggerplant
 Stylidium roseonanum
 Stylidium roseum
 Stylidium rosulatum
 Stylidium rotundifolium
 Syn.: S. irriguum
 Stylidium rubriscapum
 Stylidium rupestre : rock triggerplant
 Stylidium sacculatum
 Syn.: S. repens var. sacculatum : locket triggerplant
 Stylidium scabridum : moth triggerplant
 Syn.: S. laxiflorum
 Stylidium scandens : climbing triggerplant
 Stylidium scariosum
 Stylidium schizanthum
 Stylidium schoenoides : cow kicks
 Stylidium sejunctum
 Stylidium semaphorum
 Stylidium semipartitum
 Stylidium septentrionale
 Syn.: S. bulbiferum var. septentrionale
 Stylidium serrulatum
 Stylidium setaceum
 Stylidium setigerum
 Stylidium sidjamesii
 Stylidium simulans
 Stylidium sinicum
 Stylidium soboliferum
 Stylidium spathulatum : creamy triggerplant
 Stylidium spinulosum : topsy-turvy triggerplant
 Stylidium squamellosum : maze triggerplant
 Syn.: S. chrysanthum
 Stylidium squamosotuberosum : fleshy-rhizomed triggerplant
 Stylidium stenophyllum
 Stylidium stenosepalum
 Stylidium stipitatum
 Stylidium striatum : fan-leaved triggerplant
 Syn.: S. rigidifolium : stiff-leaved triggerplant
 Stylidium subulatum
 Stylidium suffruticosum
 Stylidium sulcatum
 Stylidium symonii
 Stylidium tenellum
 Stylidium tenerrimum
 Stylidium tenerum
 Stylidium tenue
 Syn.: S. brunonianum var. minor
 Stylidium tenuicarpum
 Stylidium tenuifolium
 Stylidium tepperianum
 Stylidium tetrandra
 Stylidium thesioides : delicate triggerplant
 Syn.: S. canaliculatum
 Stylidium thyrsiforme
 Stylidium tinkeri
 Stylidium torticarpum
 Stylidium trichopodum
 Stylidium turbinatum
 Stylidium tylosum
 Stylidium udusicola
 Stylidium uliginosum
 Stylidium umbellatum
 Stylidium uniflorum : pincushion triggerplant
 Stylidium utriculariodes : pink fan triggerplant
 Stylidium validum
 Stylidium velleioides
 Stylidium verticillatum: pink mountain triggerplant
 Stylidium violaceum : violet triggerplant
 Stylidium vitiense
 Stylidium warriedarense
 Stylidium weeliwolli
 Stylidium wightianum
 Stylidium wilroyense
 Stylidium xanthopis : yellow eyed triggerplant
 Stylidium yilgarnense : Yilgarn triggerplant
 Syn.: S. glanduliferum
 Stylidium zeicolor : maize triggerplant

References

External links 
 International Plant Names Index (IPNI) list of published Stylidium species names.
 Western Australia's Flora Base list of Stylidium species .

Stylidium